Marta Piotrowska née Langner (born 29 December 1991) is a Polish Paralympic athlete who competes in 100 metres, 200 metres and long jump events in international level events.

References

1991 births
Living people
People from Zduńska Wola
Paralympic athletes of Poland
Polish female sprinters
Polish female long jumpers
Athletes (track and field) at the 2008 Summer Paralympics
Athletes (track and field) at the 2012 Summer Paralympics
Athletes (track and field) at the 2020 Summer Paralympics